Saint-Brieuc – Armor Airport  is an airport situated  northwest of Saint-Brieuc, a commune of the Côtes-d'Armor department in the Brittany region of northwestern France.

The airport is located in Trémuson and is also referred to as the Saint-Brieuc - Trémuson Airport.

The airport is also a maintenance base for Atlantic Air Industries (AAI) which specialises in the overhaul and maintenance of regional and commuter airliners. The company occupies a large hangar on site.

Airlines and destinations

The airport is currently not served by scheduled services. However, Isles of Scilly Skybus did operate a service to Cornwall Airport Newquay on a summer only basis throughout the late 2000s (decade) - this had been dropped by summer 2011.

Statistics

References

External links
  Aéroport de Saint Brieuc Armor
  Aéroport de Saint-Brieuc - Armor (SBK / LFRT) at Union des Aéroports Français
 note 1 AAI website 
 

Airports in Brittany
Buildings and structures in Côtes-d'Armor
Saint-Brieuc